Eirlys Bellin is a Welsh actress, character comedian and voice-over artist from Cowbridge in South Wales.

Bellin trained at the University of Edinburgh and the Mountview Academy of Theatre Arts. She has been a regular on the London circuit starring in character comedy shows like Spank! And Something for the Weekend. In her hit debut solo show Eirlys Bellin: Reality Check, she performed as Welsh celebrity wannabe Rhian Davies at Holyrood, Edinburgh, Edinburgh in 2007, which spawned many reviews in her favour. Her 2010 Edinburgh Show Unaccustomed As I Am was directed by Logan Murray.

Bellin was also a semi-finalist in Funny Women Awards at the Manchester Comedy Festival.

Television roles
{| class="wikitable" style="font-size: 90%;"
! colspan="4" style="background: LightSteelBlue;" | Television
|-
! Year !! Title !! Role !! Notes
|-
| 2000 || The Magic Paintbrush: A Story from China || Girl || Voice
|-
| 2005 || Doctor Who || Bev || Episode: Father's Day 
|-
| 2008 || High Hopes || Ffion ||  Episode: Saturday Night and Sunday Morning
|-
| ? || Herio’r Ddraig || ||
|-
| ? || Pobol y Cwm || ||
|-
| ? || A470 || ||
|-
| ? || Teledu Eddie || ||
|-
| 2014 || Stella || Reporter || 'Christmas Special'
|-
|}

Other appearances
 Stardust (BBC Radio 4)
 Hole (BBC Radio 4)
 Pips (BBC Radio 4)
 A Traveller in Time (BBC Radio 4)
 Tower (BBC Radio 4)
 Truth or Dare (BBC Radio Wales)
 Bob The Builder (S4C)
 Sabrina, the Animated Series (S4C)

In 2008, she featured in A Complete History of My Sexual Failures (Chris Waitt, Warp X), and also directed children's animation series Raymond'' (VSI for TV Toonland).

References

External links
 
 Official Eirlys Bellin website.

Welsh radio actresses
Year of birth missing (living people)
Living people
Place of birth missing (living people)
Welsh-speaking actors
Welsh television actresses
Welsh women comedians